The college departments and former high school of the Immaculate Heart of Mary Seminary in Tagbilaran City, Bohol, Philippines have graduate notable people, including priests and pastors, missionaries, and lay people in politics, academia, music and arts, medicine, and the private and public sectors.

Below is a list of notable people affiliated with the Immaculate Heart of Mary Seminary including graduates, former students, and former professors.

Bishops
 Msgr. Alfredo Bacquial † – former Auxiliary Bishop of the Archdiocese of Davao
 Msgr. Antonieto Dumagan Cabajog, D.D. – Bishop of the Diocese of Surigao
 Most Rev. Onesimo Gordoncillo, D.D. – Archbishop of the Archdiocese of Capiz
 Msgr. Zacarias Cenita Jimenez, D.D. – Bishop of the Diocese of Pagadian
 Msgr. Juan de Dios Mataflorida Pueblos, D.D. – Bishop of the Diocese of Butuan
 Most Rev. Jesus B. Tuquib, D.D. – Archbishop of Cagayan de Oro

 Msgr. Felix Zafra † – former Bishop of the Diocese of Tagbilaran

International diocesans
 Fr. Marino Aguhar – Houston, Texas, USA
 Fr. Edito Amora – USA
 Fr. Silvano Amora – New Jersey, USA
 Msgr. Floro Arcamo – Pastor, Star of the Sea Church, San Francisco, USA
 Fr. Arturo Auza – Tampa, Florida, USA
 Fr. Cromwell Cabrisos – Orlando, Florida, USA
 Fr. Faron Calumba – Hartford, USA
 Fr. Jesus Camacho – USA
 Fr. Joel Cantones – Pastor, St.John the Baptist Church, Edgard, Louisiana, USA
 Fr. Antonio Castro – Pastor, St. Hyacinth Catholic Church, Archdiocese of Galveston, Houston, Texas, USA
 Fr. Rolando Caverte – San Francisco, USA
 Fr. Rustico Centino – USA
 Fr. Alexander Concon – Chicago, Illinois, USA
 Fr. Felix Cubelo – Diocese of San Angelo, Texas, USA
 Fr. Manuel "Boboy" Curso – Pastor, Holy Angels Church Colma, California, USA
 Fr. Danilo Digal – Pastor, Our Lady of Prompt Succor, Chalmette, Louisiana, USA
 Fr. Malaquias Fuerzas – USA
 Fr. Evencio Gallego – Stockton, California, USA
 Fr. Bernardito Getigan – Holy Redeemer Church, Odessa, Texas, USA
 Fr. Floro Hinacay – Diocese of San Angelo, Texas, USA
 Fr. Joseph D. Lim – Chaplain, United States Air Force, Texas, USA
 Fr. Aurelio Luzon Jr. – Associate Pastor, Annunziata Parish, Houma, Louisiana, USA
 Fr. Roger Madrazo – Parish Priest, St. Francis de Sales Church, Marsh Harbour, Abaco, Bahamas; Archdiocese of Nassau
 Fr. Benito Manding – Pastor, Diocese of San Jose, California
 Fr. Florente Mendana – USA
 Fr. Gabriel Mission – Los Angeles
 Fr. Robustiano Morgia – Associate Pastor, St. Maria Goretti Church, New Orleans, Louisiana, USA
 Fr. Nilo Nalugon – Diocese of San Angelo, Texas, USA
 Fr. Alner Uy Nambatac – Associate Pastor, St. Hilary of Poitiers, Mathews, Louisiana, USA
 Fr. Ramon Jose Oncog – Diocese of Burlington, Vermont, USA
 Fr. Domingo Orimaco – Pastor, Our Lady of the Pillar Church Half Moon Bay, California, USA
 Fr. Roland Pacudan – composer of "IHMS, We Love You", the IHMS alma mater song; now based in Kailua, Hawaii, USA, and assigned to the Our Lady of Perpetual Help parish and St. Anthony de Padua Parish
 Fr. Jaime Parnada – USA
 Msgr. John Pernia – San Francisco, USA
 Fr. Arecio Pesquira – USA
 Fr. Fernando "Dodong" Po – Parochial Vicar, Church of St. Elizabeth, Wyckoff, New Jersey, USA
 Fr. Asiscio Podelino – Peterborough, Ontario, Canada
 Fr. Bernard Rañoa – Administrator, Sacred Heart Parish, Brawley, California, USA
 Fr. Clarito "Boy" Rara – Chaplain, Houston, Texas, USA
 Fr. Manuel Recera – Chicago, Illinois, USA
 Fr. Sabino "Ado" Rebosura, III – Morgan City, Louisiana USA
 Fr. Jovencio Ricafort – Pastor, Mater Dei Catholic Church, Chula Vista, California, USA
 Fr. Jonas Romea – USA
 Fr. Edwin Ruano – Orlando, Florida, USA
 Rev. Blair Lope M. Sabaricos – Associate Pastor, Our Lady of the Sacred Heart Church, Church Point, Louisiana, USA
 Fr. Leoncio Santiago – Chicago, Illinois, USA
 Fr. Fr. TQ Solis, Jr. – Ocala, Florida, USA
 Fr. Hilario Soliva – New York City, USA
 Fr. Eugene D. Tungol – Pastor, Church of the Epiphany San Francisco, USA; Chairman, Council of Priests, Archdiocese of San Francisco
 Fr. Vicente Tungol – Winnipeg, Manitoba, Canada
 Fr. Edwin Tutor – Associate Pastor, St. Charles Parish, South San Diego, Imperial Beach, San Diego, USA
 Fr. Avelino "Val" Vale – Associate Pastor, St. Michael Church, Crowley, Louisiana, USA
 Fr. Vicente Valles – Peterborough, Ontario, Canada
 Fr. Roque "Khing" Vaño – Pastor, San Diego, California, USA
 Fr. Toribio Villacastin – Flushing, New York, USA
 Fr. Arnold Zamora – Star of the Sea Parish, San Francisco, California, USA

Local diocesan
 Fr. John Bosco Abellana – parish priest, Our Lady of Good Voyage, Camarin, Novaliches, Quezon City
 Fr. Zenon Ampong – parish priest, Davao City
 Fr. Alger Angcla – parish priest, Loboc, Bohol
 Fr. Reuben "Daves" Angcla – parish priest, Our Lady of Mount Carmel Parish, Balilihan, Bohol
 Fr. Simplicio "Peon" Apalisok, Jr. – former parish priest, Mount Carmel Parish, Project 6, Diocese of Cubao, Quezon City
 Fr. Andres "Andy" Ayco – parish priest, Tagbilaran City
 Fr. Jude Besinga – Chaplain, Camp Crame, Quezon City
 Fr. "Boy" Biliran – parish priest, Manila
 Fr. Joseph Biliran – parish priest, Diocese of Novaliches, Quezon City
 Fr. Celio Bomediano – Diocese of Dumaguete
 Fr. Presciano Boncales – Diocese of Talibon
 Fr. Jovilo "Jovil" Bongay – parish priest, Panacan, Davao City
 Fr. "Tiloy" Castino – Chaplain, Camp Crame, Quezon City
 Fr. Victor Emmanuel "Bobot" Clemen – parish priest, San Bartolome Parish, Novaliches Bayan, Diocese of Novaliches, Quezon City
 Msgr. Cirilo Darunday, Jr. – parish priest of Dao, Tagbilaran City
 Msgr. Pelagio Dompor † – first Rector of IHMS, Protonotary Apostolic, former Vicar-General of Tagbilaran City (deceased)
 Fr. Michael Gementiza – Archdiocese of Zamboanga
 Fr. Victor Gilay – parish priest, San Pedro Cathedral, Davao City
 Fr. Emmanuel "Bobong" Gonzaga – parish priest, Davao City
 Fr. Leonel Grado – parish priest, Catagbacan, Loon, Bohol
 Fr. Roger Madrazo – parish priest, St. Francis de Sales Church, Marsh Harbour, Abaco, Bahamas; Archdiocese of Nassau
 Msgr. Crisologo B. Manongas – Vicar General, Archdiocese of Zamboanga
 Fr. Jonathan Pacudan, younger brother of Roland, wrote the lyrics of the IHMS alma mater song; assigned to Our Lady of Consolation Parish, Guindulman, Bohol
 Fr. Emigdio "Migs" A. Paredes – chaplain, Veterans Memorial Medical Center, Quezon City
 Fr. Renato "Takyo" Regis – Catagbacan, Loon, Bohol
 Fr. Vic Valles – Archdiocese of Zamboanga
 Fr. Amado "Ding" Vaño –  Archdiocese of Zamboanga
 Fr. Sixto Vistal – Archdiocese of Zamboanga

Missionaries abroad
 Fr. Nilo Ingente, O.S.A. – Rome, Italy
 Fr. Gorgonio "Go" Llubit, M.S.P. – missionary to South Korea, Archdiocese of Seoul
 Fr. Eliseo "Loloy/Katiw" Napiere, M.S.P. – missionary to Taiwan, Diocese of Taichung: Migrants' Chaplain at Center for Migrants' Concerns – Central Taiwan

Vatican diplomatic service
 Archbishop Bernardito "Barney" Auza – Vatican Ambassador to the United Nations, New York
 Msgr. Edward Karaan – Secretary, Apostolic Nunciature in Morocco

CBCP
 Fr. Milan Ted Torralba – secretary-general of the Catholic Bishops Conference of the Philippines (CBCP); chairman of the Permanent Committee for the Cultural Heritage of the church

Local religious orders
 Fr. Socrates "Soc" Mesiona, MSP – Father Moderator (or Superior) of the Mission Society of the Philippines
 Rev. Alphonse M. Mildner, SVD – first rector of IHMS (1950–1960); founder of the Divine Word College of Laoag in 1946
 Fr. Sisinio "Paddax" Paderog, OSA

Private sector
 Luis Michael Abellana – Operations Manager, Metrobank, Las Pinas Branch, M.M.
 Charles N. Alferez – executive director, DCMI, Dipolog, Philippines
 Atty. Antonio "Jun" Amora, Jr. – Provincial Administrator, Provincial Government of Bohol
 Fr. Estanislao "Baby" Amper, CPA – now based in Makati
 Manuel "Nox" Arcamo – Chief Information Officer (CIO), Ayala Foundation; consultant, UP-Ayala Technology Business Incubator; former Filipiniana Manager, Filipinas Heritage Library
 Charlito "Charlie" S. Ayco – Regional Program Officer, Habitat for Humanity International (East / Southeast Asia Region)
 Jimmy Borja – professional composer and record producer in Manila and the United States
 Brigido "Brydon" Lungay – professional musician and fine artist
 Ernesto Del Mar Pernia – senior economist of Asian Development Bank (ADB) and professor at the UP School of Economics
 Hon. Rene Relampagos – former Provincial Governor, Bohol, Philippines

Government and public sector
 Hon. Roberto Cajes – lawyer and member of the Philippine House of Representatives, 12th and 13th Congress, Representative of the 2nd District of Bohol, Honorable Chairman of the Committee on Ethics and Privileges
 Atty Herman "Mannix" Cimafranca – the first BANGKA President, finished law at the Ateneo de Manila; served as Corporate Secretary of National Construction Company (NCC); he was with the Office of the Government Corporate Counsel (OGCC); Atty Cimafranca is now an Assistant Solicitor General
 Engr. Ariel Dominguez – Head, GSO, Provincial Government of Bohol
 Hon. Robert Peligro – Municipal Kagawad, Duero, Bohol
 Hon. Stephen Rances – Municipal Mayor, Mabini, Bohol
 Hon. Yves Yu † – Municipal Vice-Mayor, Calape, Bohol (deceased)

Education
 Engr. Dionisio Neil A. Balite, PhD – Director of Bohol Institute of Technology – International College, Tagbilaran City
 Fr. Victor Bompat – Immaculate Heart of Mary Seminary
 Fr. Aloysius Cartagenas – formator and professor, Seminario Mayor de San Carlos, Mabolo, Cebu City
 Fr. Jaime Cempron – Doctor of Philosophy, professor, De La Salle University
 Fr. Jose Conrado Estapia – Academic Dean (College), Immaculate Heart of Mary Seminary
 Fr. Absalon Florenosos – Spiritual Director, Immaculate Heart of Mary Seminary
 Fr. Irvin Garsuta – Music Director, Immaculate Heart of Mary Seminary
 Fr. Crisolito Geangan – Procurator and Academic Dean (Pre-college), Immaculate Heart of Mary Seminary
 Dr. Prisciano S. Legitimas – Principal of Holy Name University-Grade School, Tagbilaran City
 Fr. Martin Lupiba – Rector, Immaculate Heart of Mary Seminary
 Fr. Claverlito Migriño – Prefect of Discipline, Immaculate Heart of Mary Seminary
 Fr. Valentino "Val" U. Pinlac – Superintendent, Bohol Association of Catholic Schools or BACS
 Caesar Saloma, PhD – Chancellor, University of the Philippines Diliman; recipient of the Galileo Galilei award from the International Commission for Optics

See also
 Immaculate Heart of Mary Seminary
 Diocese of Tagbilaran
 Diocese of Talibon
 Paring Bol-anon

References

External links
 IHMS Names Database
 IHMS Alumni Corner

Filipino Roman Catholic priests
Education in Bohol
IHMS Alumni
Immaculate Heart of Mary Seminary